Les Bleus may refer to:

National team of France
Les Bleus (French for "The Blues") is often used in a French sporting context, and in particular may refer to:
 France's national team:
 France national football team
 France national rugby union team
 France national basketball team
 France men's national ice hockey team
 France men's national field hockey team

Other uses
 Les Bleus (TV series), M6 French police drama television series
Les Bleus, a nickname for football club SC Bastia

See also
 Bleu (disambiguation)
Bleu de France (disambiguation)
 Lebleu (disambiguation)
Les Bleues (disambiguation)